Anite  is a supplier of test and measurement software to the international wireless market. It provides testing, measurement, optimisation and analytics systems based on its specialist sector knowledge and its proprietary software and hardware products. Customers include major manufacturers of mobile devices, chipsets and network equipment, mobile network operators, regulatory authorities, and independent test houses.

History
The company was founded in 1973 as Cray Electronics: in October 1996 it changed its name to Anite Group plc. In 2006 it acquired Nemo, a network testing business. In October 2007 it changed its name to Anite plc. In April 2015, Anite acquired Setcom Wireless Products GmbH.

After Anite started struggling in the face of cancellation of orders from Blackberry, Nokia and Motorola, Anite received a takeover offer from US electronics test and measurement company, Keysight Technologies in a deal worth £388 million in June 2015. The acquisition was completed in August 2015.

Operations
The company has two sides to its business:
 Device & Infrastructure Testing and Network Testing for the wireless market

See also
Future Office System

References

Software companies of the United Kingdom
1973 establishments in England
Software companies established in 1973
British companies established in 1973
2015 mergers and acquisitions